What's On Kyiv or What's On Kiev was a weekly, then monthly, then online English-language magazine published in Ukraine's capital Kyiv which covered both Kyiv, and Ukraine at large. As of late 2020, the magazine is defunct.

History

What's On was founded in 1999, the first Editor-In-Chief was Amanda Pitt. Peter Dickinson then edited between 2001 and 2007, followed by Neil Campbell. Campbell handed over editorial duties in 2011 to Lana Nicole Niland. What's On was then owned by PAN Publishing, who also published Panorama, the in-flight magazine of Ukraine International Airlines. What's On was read widely in the expatriate (business and diplomatic) community, and distributed free of charge directly to embassies and businesses, as well as around the city. What's On was also read by large numbers of English speaking Ukrainians. The magazine featured news articles, also articles on Ukrainian society, culture, politics, history, business, showbusiness and interviews with prominent people either Ukrainian, or connected to Ukraine. What's On also had a travel and nightlife section, as well as restaurant reviews, and full Kyiv entertainment listings.

The magazine ceased regular publication after Euromaidan in 2013/14, which the magazine had supported. In the summer of 2014 a special edition of What's On was published, the "Chronicle of a Revolution" - a compendium of the news and photo coverage and some feature articles that had been published in What's On during the 12-week period of Euromaidan.

After a break from early 2014, What's On returned in September 2017, published on a monthly basis, owned by Outpost Publishing, Lana Nicole Niland was the owner and Editor-in-Chief of this publication. In 2019 the magazine went online only, and in late 2020, the magazine announced on their official website that they were here in Kyiv and will be back in business with and for you soon. Since then there have been no further publications, and as of 2022 What's On is defunct.

References

External links

1999 establishments in Ukraine
English-language magazines
Local interest magazines
Magazines established in 1999
Magazines published in Kyiv
Monthly magazines